Mestwin I  ( or , ; c. 1160 – 1/2 May 1219 or 1220) was Prince of Pomerelia (styled himself as princeps Pomoranorum) from about 1205 until his death.

Mestwin was a member of the Samborides dynasty, the son of Duke Sobiesław of Gdańsk and younger brother of Sambor I, whom he succeeded in Pomerelia. In the tables of Oliwa Abbey, outside Danzig, he is recorded as pacificus ("the Peaceful"). 

As Mestwin I, dei gracia princeps in Gdanzk, he had founded a convent of nuns (probably the Premonstratensian abbey of Żukowo), the castellany of Białogarda at the border with the Pomeranian Lands of Schlawe and Stolp on the Łeba river, and several villages between the rivers Radunia and Słupia. After King Valdemar II of Denmark had conquered the southern coast of the Baltic Sea with Gdanzk  during a crusade against the Old Prussians, Duke Mestwin in 1210 had to accept Danish overlordship, but was able to free himself again the next year. 

He was married to Swinisława (d. 1240), formerly referred to as a daughter of Duke Ratibor I of Pomerania. They had eight children:
 Hedwig, married Duke Władysław Odonic of Greater Poland
 Swietopelk II, Duke of Pomerania, succeeded his father as Duke of Pomerelia, from 1227 of Pomerelia-Gdańsk
  Mirosława, married Bogislaw II, Duke of Pomerania at Stettin
 Witosława, prioress of Żukowo Abbey
 Warcisław, Duke at Świecie from 1227
 Sambor II, Duke at Lubiszewo from 1233
 Ratibor, Duke at Białogard from 1233
 Milosława, nun at Żukowo Abbey

See also
 List of Pomeranian duchies and dukes
 Pomerania during the High Middle Ages

References 

Specific

General

Literature  
 Theodor Hirsch, Max Töppen, Ernst Gottfried Wilhelm Strehlke: Scriptores Rerum Prussicarum: Die Geschichtsquellen der preussischen Vorzeit 

1160s births
1220 deaths
Dukes of Pomerania
Samborides